Udal was an Indian state politician and member of Uttar Pradesh Legislative Assembly. He was a nine-time MLA from Kolasla constituency on the CPI-M ticket. He was one of the prominent leaders of CPI-M.

References

Year of birth missing (living people)
Living people
Communist Party of India (Marxist) politicians from Uttar Pradesh
Uttar Pradesh MLAs 1962–1967
Uttar Pradesh MLAs 1967–1969
Uttar Pradesh MLAs 1974–1977
Uttar Pradesh MLAs 1977–1980
Uttar Pradesh MLAs 1980–1985
Uttar Pradesh MLAs 1989–1991
Uttar Pradesh MLAs 1993–1996